The 2009 WNBA All-Star Game was played on July 25, 2009 at Mohegan Sun Arena in Uncasville, Connecticut, home of the Connecticut Sun. The game was the 9th annual WNBA All-Star Game. This was the second time Connecticut had hosted the basketball showcase, after previously hosting the 2005 game.

The All-Star Game

Rosters

1 Injured
2 Injury replacement
3 Starting in place of injured player

Coaches
The coach for the Western Conference all-stars was San Antonio Silver Stars coach Dan Hughes. The coach for the Eastern Conference was Indiana Fever coach Lin Dunn.

Other events

Three-Point Shootout

Skills Challenge

References

Wnba All-star Game, 2009
Women's National Basketball Association All-Star Game